Murd or Mowrd may refer to:
 Murd-e Susani, Fars Province
 Murd, Hormozgan
 Murd, Andika, Khuzestan Province
 Murd, Bagh-e Malek, Khuzestan Province
 Murd, Izeh, Khuzestan Province
 Murd-e Ghaffar, Khuzestan Province
 Murd-e Sadat, Khuzestan Province
 Murd, Lali, Khuzestan Province
 Mowrd, Kohgiluyeh and Boyer-Ahmad
 Murd, Bahmai, Kohgiluyeh and Boyer-Ahmad Province
 Murd, Boyer-Ahmad, Kohgiluyeh and Boyer-Ahmad Province
 Murd Risheh, Kohgiluyeh and Boyer-Ahmad Province
 Murd-e Seyyed Gambuli, Kohgiluyeh and Boyer-Ahmad Province

See also
 Deh Murd